Leptospermum sejunctum is a shrub that is endemic to the Nowra district in New South Wales. It has thin, grey bark, lance-shaped to elliptical leaves, white flowers and fruit that remain on the plant at maturity.

Description
Leptospermum sejunctum is a shrub that typically grows to a height . It has thin, grey bark, the younger stems more or less glabrous with a conspicuous flange. The flowers are borne singly on short side shoots from adjacent leaf axils.

Taxonomy and naming
Leptospermum sejunctum was first formally described in 1989 by Joy Thompson in the journal Telopea, based on plant material collected near Nowra in 1981. The species is named for its location, separate from the somewhat similar L. variabile and L. oreophilum.

Distribution and habitat
This tea-tree grows in sandy soil in forest near Nowra.

References

sejunctum
Myrtales of Australia
Flora of New South Wales
Plants described in 1989
Taxa named by Joy Thompson